Genco University is a privately held institution that is located in Nairobi, Kenya. This institution is not owned by the country and is privately funded. It can also be considered a closed corporation. It is an online university that specializes in an online curriculum for potential students who are interested in non-traditional learning, or potential students who are convinced by non-traditional learning. The school was created to help people with time, space, and distance barriers to receive an education. Since the establishment of the institution in 2008, it has employed a minimum of 50 employees. In order to get international recognition, the college is trying to get accreditation from the Commission for Higher Education (CHE).

See also
 Universities in Kenya

References

External links
 

Universities and colleges in Kenya
Education in Nairobi